June Jackson Christmas is a psychiatrist, a former New York City Commissioner of Mental Health and Mental Retardation Services, member of President Jimmy Carter transition team, the beneficiary of Human-Services Award, the founder of a community psychiatric program in Harlem - Harlem Rehabilitation Center. Christmas served as a member of Governor Mario Cuomo's Advisory Committee on Black Affairs.

Christmas has served as vice-president of the American Psychiatric Association and the president of the Public Health Association of NYC. In 1999, she received the Lifetime Achievement Award by the National Medical Fellowships. She also was a member of Vassar's Board of Trustees from 1978 to 1989. She is a former executive director of the Urban Issues Group, an organization with focus on issues specific to New Yorkers of African descent.

Career 
June Jackson Christmas was born in Cambridge, Massachusetts. She graduated from Vassar College and the Boston University School of Medicine. She left private practice to set up the Harlem Hospital Rehabilitation Center and to teach at Columbia University. Her achievements with the Rehabilitation Center were later honored with awards:
 in 1974 with Human Services Award
 in 1976 with Award for Excellence in the Field of Domestic Health of the American Public Health Association

Christmas was appointed Commissioner of Mental Health and Mental Retardation Services on August 16, 1972, by New York Mayor John Lindsay. In 1976 she was part of the Jimmy Carter presidential campaign as a health advisor, and subsequently as part the Carter transition team, leading the transition of the Department of Health, Education and Welfare from Republican to Democratic hands. In 1978 Mayor Ed Koch reappointed Christmas as the city's Commissioner of Mental Health, Mental Retardation.

References 

Living people
Mental health professionals
American psychiatrists
Vassar College alumni
Year of birth missing (living people)